Guylaine Cloutier (born October 1, 1971) is a former competition swimmer from Canada, who was a breaststroke specialist.  Cloutier competed internationally at three consecutive Summer Olympics, starting in 1988.  Her best Olympic finish was fourth place in the 100-metre breaststroke at the 1992 Summer Olympics in Barcelona, Spain.

References
 Canadian Olympic Committee
 

1971 births
Canadian female breaststroke swimmers
French Quebecers
Living people
Olympic swimmers of Canada
People from Lévis, Quebec
Sportspeople from Quebec
Swimmers at the 1988 Summer Olympics
Swimmers at the 1990 Commonwealth Games
Swimmers at the 1992 Summer Olympics
Swimmers at the 1995 Pan American Games
Swimmers at the 1996 Summer Olympics
Commonwealth Games medallists in swimming
Pan American Games silver medalists for Canada
Commonwealth Games silver medallists for Canada
Pan American Games medalists in swimming
Universiade medalists in swimming
Universiade gold medalists for Canada
Universiade bronze medalists for Canada
Medalists at the 1991 Summer Universiade
Medalists at the 1993 Summer Universiade
Medalists at the 1995 Pan American Games
20th-century Canadian women
Medallists at the 1990 Commonwealth Games